Makurdi is the capital of Benue State, located in central Nigeria, and part of the Middle Belt region of central Nigeria. The city is situated on the south bank of the Benue River. In 2016, Makurdi and the surrounding areas had an estimated population of 365,000.

History 
Makurdi was established in 1927. In 1976, it became the capital of Benue State.

This city was one of the sites of the End SARS protests in 2020.

Demographics
The major ethnic groups are the Tiv, Idoma, Igede, Jukun, Agatu, Etulo, Alago, Igbo.

Education
Makurdi is home to Benue State University; University of Agriculture, Makurdi; Nigeria Army School Of Military Engineering, Makurdi; and Akawe Torkula Polytechnic, ATP, Makurdi.

There are secondary schools located in Makurdi including Government Secondary School, North-Bank, Special Science Senior Secondary School, Tilley Gyado College, North-Bank, Mount Saint Gabriel Secondary School, Government College, and Government Girls' Secondary School.

Climate

Transport 
Makurdi is located on the banks of Benue River, a major tributary of the Niger River.

It is on the main narrow gauge railway line running north from Port Harcourt. There are regular bus services linking Makurdi to neighbouring towns.

Until a road rail bridge was built in 1932, a train ferry was used to cross the Benue river.

There is an airport in Makurdi.

Military 
Makurdi contains the base for the Nigerian Air Force's CAC/PAC JF-17 Thunder, MiG 21 and SEPECAT Jaguar aircraft squadrons and the Nigeria Army's 72 Special Forces (SF) Battalion

Agriculture

Benue State is predominantly an agricultural area specialising in cash crops and subsistence crops.

Resources 
Limestone and marble can be found in the area.

See also
Federal Medical Centre, Makurdi

References 

Nigerian Air Force
State capitals in Nigeria
Benue River
Local Government Areas in Benue State
Cities in Nigeria